Let Me Down Easy may refer to:

Music

"Let Me Down Easy" (Bettye LaVette song), 1965
"Let Me Down Easy", by Little Milton, 1968
"Let Me Down Easy" by Cher, from the album Foxy Lady, 1972
"Let Me Down Easy", by Cornelius Brothers & Sister Rose, from the album Cornelius Brothers & Sister Rose, 1972
"Let Me Down Easy", by the Ralph McTell, from the album Easy, 1974
"Let Me Down Easy", by the Isley Brothers, from the album Harvest for the World, 1976
"Let Me Down Easy", by Shirley Eikhard, from the album Let Me Down Easy, 1976
"Let Me Down Easy" (Cristy Lane song), 1977
"Let Me Down Easy", by Jim Glaser, from the album The Man In the Mirror, 1983
"Let Me Down Easy", by the Stranglers, from the album Aural Sculpture, 1984
"Let Me Down Easy" (Roger Daltrey song), 1985
"Let Me Down Easy", by Exposé, from the album What You Don't Know, 1989
"Let Me Down Easy", by Chris Isaak, from the album Always Got Tonight, 2002
"Let Me Down Easy", by Saving Jane, from the album SuperGirl, 2008
"Let Me Down Easy" by Case, from the album The Rose Experience, 2009
"Let Me Down Easy" (Billy Currington song), 2010
"Let Me Down Easy" (Paolo Nutini song), 2014
"Let Me Down Easy" (Sheppard song), 2015
"Let Me Down Easy", by Jake Gerber,theme from television show on ABC " The Bachelor " 2015
"Let Me Down Easy (Gang of Youths song)", by Gang of Youths, from the album Go Farther in Lightness, 2017
"Let Me Down Easy", by Jojo Mason, from the extended play Sky Full of Stars, 2021

Other
Let Me Down Easy, a solo play written by and starring Anna Deavere Smith
"Let Me Down Easy (Lie)", a song by Why Don't We